Hans Joby (3 August 1884 – 30 April 1943) was an Austrian film actor. He appeared in 63 films between 1920 and 1944. He was also billed as "Captain John Peters", and often played aristocratic Prussian-types, memorably in Laurel and Hardy's silent short Double Whoopee. He was born in Kronstadt, Austria-Hungary (now Braşov, Romania) and died in Los Angeles, California.

Selected filmography
Ranson's Folly (1926)
The Student Prince in Old Heidelberg (1927)
The Enemy (1927)
A Dog of the Regiment (1927)
The Scarlet Lady (1929)
Double Whoopee (1929)
I Met Him in Paris (1937)
 Special Agent K-7 (1937)

References

External links

1884 births
1943 deaths
Austrian male film actors
Austrian male silent film actors
People from Brașov
20th-century Austrian male actors
Austrian emigrants to the United States